Uditnagar Government High School is a state-run coeducational primary and middle school located in the Uditnagar section of Rourkela, Odisha, India. Founded in 1954 as a private school, it is one of the oldest schools in Rourkela. In 1955 it was granted grade 'B' class government institution status. The school is affiliated to the Board of Secondary Education, Odisha, recognized under the State Government of Odisha Education. Bansidhara Barik is the principal.

Courses offered
The school offers  primary, middle and secondary education from class 1 to 10. It prepares students for Class 10 (Matric) examinations for the Board of Secondary Education, Odisha.

Activities
Scouts, Guides and JRC
National Cadet Corps

See also
 Government Autonomous College, Rourkela
 Municipal College, Rourkela

References

Primary schools in India
High schools and secondary schools in Odisha
Schools in Rourkela
Educational institutions established in 1954
1954 establishments in Orissa